Carmen Patricia Freire Chiluisa (born 28 August 1984), known as Patricia Freire, is an Ecuadorian retired footballer who played as a midfielder. She has been a member of the Ecuador women's national team.

International career
Freire played for Ecuador at senior level in two Copa América Femenina editions (2003 and 2010) and the 2007 Pan American Games.

International goals
Scores and results list Ecuador's goal tally first

References

External links

1984 births
Living people
Women's association football midfielders
Ecuadorian women's footballers
People from Quevedo, Ecuador
Ecuador women's international footballers
S.D. Quito footballers
L.D.U. Quito Femenino players
21st-century Ecuadorian women